The Richmond metropolitan area is a metropolitan area centered on Richmond, Virginia.

Richmond metropolitan area may also refer to:
The Richmond, Kentucky micropolitan area, United States
The Richmond, Indiana micropolitan area, United States

See also
Richmond (disambiguation)